Stuart Worth Aberdeen (July 19, 1935 – June 11, 1979) was an American college basketball coach. He was the head coach at Acadia in Nova Scotia and the head coach at Marshall. At Acadia, Aberdeen had a 122–50 record. He was posthumously inducted into the Acadia Hall of Fame in 1989. 

Aberdeen left Acadia to become an assistant to Ray Mears at Tennessee, where he was the lead recruiter for some of UT’s top players, including future Hall of Fame forward Bernard King. He left the Volunteers after eleven years, taking the head coaching position at Marshall. Aberdeen had a record of 25–31 in two seasons at Marshall. During the 1979 offseason, while vacationing in Florida, Aberdeen died from a heart attack while jogging.

Head coaching record

References

1935 births
1979 deaths
Academic staff of Acadia University
American expatriate basketball people in Canada
Basketball coaches from New York (state)
College men's basketball head coaches in the United States
Marshall Thundering Herd men's basketball coaches
Springfield College (Massachusetts) alumni
Sportspeople from Niagara Falls, New York
Tennessee Volunteers basketball coaches
Tusculum  University alumni
U Sports coaches
Sports deaths in Florida